Adi Asia Katz (born 31 March 2004) is an Israeli rhythmic gymnast. She is the 2022 European bronze medallist in Ribbon, and Team Bronze medallist. As a Junior, She was the 2019 Junior World silver medalist with Ribbon and bronze medalist with Clubs.

Career

Junior
She competed at the 2018 Junior European Championships in Guadalajara, Spain, where she placed 41st in Hoop Qualifications and 8th in Ribbon Qualifications. Next day, she improved her result with Ribbon, when she placed 5th in the final. A year later, she took part in the 2019 Junior World Championships as a part of Israeli team, which won bronze medal in Team ranking. She also won silver medal in Ribbon final and bronze medal in Clubs final.

Senior
She debuted as a senior in 2020, but made her first big international appearance at World Cup Sofia in 2021.  She placed 15th in All-around and qualified to Hoop final, where she ended on 8th place. Then she also competed at World Challenge Cup Minsk and placed 9th in All-around. In Clubs final, she took 6th place.
On a national level, she became the all-around champion of 2021 in Israel. 

She won her first-ever World Cup medal in 2022, at World Cup Baku. It was bronze in Hoop final, behind Italian Sofia Raffaeli and Bulgarian Boryana Kaleyn. Afterwards, she won another medal, silver in Clubs final at World Challenge Cup Pamplona in May. She achieved her first win at World Challenge Cup Portimão, where she won gold medal in All-around in front of Darja Varfolomeev and Eva Brezalieva, becoming the second Israeli rhythmic gymnast to win gold in All-around at FIG World Cup.

She was selected to compete at the 2022 European Championship in her home city, Katz qualified for the All-Around and ribbon finals. On Saturday she finished 11th in the All-Around final with a score of 124.450, on the same day she earned a bronze medal in the team category along with Daria Atamanov and the senior group. The next day, she had earned that bronze medal in the Ribbon competition.

Routine music information

Competitive highlights 
(Team competitions in seniors are held only at the World Championships, Europeans and other Continental Games.)

References

External links 

 
 

2004 births
Living people
Israeli rhythmic gymnasts
Medalists at the Junior World Rhythmic Gymnastics Championships